Predator X is a fictional character appearing in American comic books published by Marvel Comics. The character is depicted as an adversary of Marvel's mutant characters, including the X-Men.

Character's biography
After learning of Emma Frost's plan to have X-23 leave the school, Cessily Kincaid takes X-23 to Salem Center for coffee to cool Laura down. Facility agents led by the Weapon Plus program (including X-23's former handler Kimura) come for one of them. Laura, believing it is her, begs Cessily to leave, but not before Kimura shoots Cessily with an electric bullet, stopping her from doing anything, and stating that they were actually there for Cessily. After capturing her, Kimura leaves before Laura can recuperate from the grenade blast. At the lab, Cessily questions who they are and what they want but is given no answers. When she replies that her friends will come for her, Kimura informs her that "The Elephant" said the same thing while showing her a picture of his corpse in a cell. Stryker, before dying, had requested a living weapon to combat the coming of the mutant Anti-Christ, predicted by Nimrod. Three huge beasts called "Predator X" were created and Mercury's metal skin was needed to give them more durability and powers. Gruesome experiments partly stripped the girl of the needed biometal, granting the beasts her powers and leaving her in extreme pain. Two of the beasts are killed, one by the *O*N*E* Sentinels, the other by X-23 and the third escaped. The experiments left her physically and mentally traumatized.

The Purifiers began tracking Predator X, in hopes of using it as a weapon against their mutant enemies and William Stryker's predicted "Anti-Christ" in particular. It was shown to have killed and eaten a rodent-like American mutant. Horribly scarred by Dust's attack, Matthew Risman is fixated on training Predator X to seek out and kill Sooraya by using abayas and niqābs bearing some recognizable quality of hers (possibly her scent). While being trained to seek out and kill Dust, Predator X senses the mutant it was originally created to destroy, turns and heads off to find it and the Purifiers follow.

During the Messiah Complex storyline, Predator X arrived in Cooperstown, Alaska looking for the child with the X-Gene, pausing to feast upon the bodies of Blockbuster and Prism. Predator X continued its search, devouring an unnamed fire-breathing mutant, and later the mutant known as Peepers.

It then made its way to the X-Mansion. Upon arrival, it dug up the graves of dead mutants from the bus attack caused by the Purifiers and began consuming those bodies. Dust, Mercury and Rockslide came across Predator X when Dust went to pay her respects to the dead.

After a brief fight with Rockslide, it headed toward the mansion and came across Trance, Indra and Wolf Cub. Surge jumped in to protect them and instructed any students to head to the infirmary. In pursuit of the wounded mutants, Predator X then managed to get past Surge and attack the infirmary, although Gentle and Armor attempted to stop it. Pixie remembered that X-23 killed a Predator X and teleported the New X-Men, Beast and the injured mutants to Muir Island. Upon arrival Predator X killed and ate Vertigo and immediately tried to attack Cable, the baby and Bishop. Bishop attacked the creature when it got between him and the baby, and Predator X ripped off and swallowed his right arm. X-Force arrived, and in the ensuing battle, Wolverine destroyed Predator X by letting it swallow him and tearing his way out of the Predator's stomach

However, another Predator X has appeared in the pages of Astonishing Tales under the command of Viper, so it remains to be seen how many creatures exist.

Following the events of Utopia, Scalphunter was recently kidnapped by a group of non-mutant super humans. They proclaim to want to save all of mutant kind, but force him to fly a plane with 5 of the creatures onto Utopia. Nightcrawler is sent to investigate Scalphunter's intentions as he approaches the island. Upon teleporting to the plane, he retreats to the surface screaming for Cyclops to shoot the plane down before it can land. Cyclops manages to shoot the plane down. However, four Predator X managed to make it to Utopia. The X-Men, Namor, and Magneto band together to defeat and slay them. Iceman is also seen burning the bodies of the slain Predator X. A sixth Predator X has been revealed to be prowling the sewers of New York as it attacks an unidentified Mutant girl. Wolverine, Psylocke, and Colossus fly there to hunt it down, but discover that Fantomex has already killed it.

Powers and abilities
Created by the scientists of the Facility and having absorbed some of Mercury's bio-metal skin, Predator X is highly resistant to physical damage, being able to draw in materials from the surrounding environment to help reform itself. The beast also possesses superhuman strength and endurance, as well as the ability to track mutants by their genetic signature alone. Predator X is essentially tireless, able to track and pursue prey without pause for great distances and lengths of time, eventually wearing the target down before going for the kill. A new ability was seen in the Messiah Complex, where it was seen to project a toxic acidic saliva over the X-Man Hepzibah. This, combined with its regenerative abilities, means that the creature can hunt down even a determined and powerful mutant and come out victorious. Predator X does appear to be vulnerable to energy blasts, as the two other creatures were swiftly dispatched by the energy weapons of an O.N.E. Sentinel or Hellion's telekinesis. The Predator's insides are not as durable as its skin; Wolverine killed it by ripping it apart from the inside out.

Victims of Predator X
So far the main Predator X, as well as later ones, are responsible for the deaths of some mutants, as well as others. These mutants include in order:

 Mammomax
 An unnamed rodent-like mutant.
 Eaten the bodies of Prism and Blockbuster.
 An unnamed fire-breathing mutant.
 Peepers
 Eaten many of the unidentified bodies of the students killed in the Purifier's bus attack.
 Vertigo
 An unnamed mutant girl living in the New York City Subway system.

In other media

Television
 Predator X appears in the Toei anime series Marvel Disk Wars: The Avengers, voiced by Tarusuke Shingaki in Japanese and Steve Blum in English.

Video games
 Multiple Predator X drones appear in the video game Marvel Heroes. They work alongside the Purifiers.

References

External links
 Predator X at Marvel.com
 Predator X at Marvel Wiki

Comics characters introduced in 2007
Fictional characters with superhuman durability or invulnerability
Fictional genetically engineered characters
Fictional mass murderers
Marvel Comics characters who can move at superhuman speeds
Marvel Comics characters with accelerated healing
Marvel Comics characters with superhuman strength
Marvel Comics supervillains
Characters created by Christopher Yost